Mohammed "Mo" Adams (born 23 September 1996) is an English professional footballer who plays as a midfielder for Al Shabab.

A youth product of Nottingham Forest and Derby County, in 2016, Adams moved to the United States and played two seasons of college soccer for the Syracuse Orange. In 2018, Adams was then chosen as the 10th overall selection by the Chicago Fire in the MLS SuperDraft.

Career

Youth
Adams started his career in the youth ranks at Nottingham Forest before moving to Derby County. He scored 15 goals for Derby County Under-18s before his release in July 2015.

Syracuse Orange
In 2016, Adams committed to Syracuse University. In his freshman year with Syracuse Orange, Adams scored once in 19 games. At the end of the season, he was named in the All-Atlantic Coast Conference Second Team and the Cuse Award winner for Male Rookie of the Year. He was a member of the ACC All-Academic Team and the Athletic Director's Honor Roll. In his sophomore year, Adams was named team captain and made 16 appearances.

Chicago Fire
On 5 January 2018, Adams signed a Generation Adidas contract with Major League Soccer, making him eligible for the 2018 MLS SuperDraft.

On 19 January 2018, Adams was selected with the 10th overall pick of the 2018 MLS SuperDraft by the Chicago Fire. He made his professional debut on 21 April 2018, starting against New York Red Bulls in a 2–1 win.

Atlanta United
On 17 July 2019, Adams was traded to Atlanta United in exchange for $100,000 of General Allocation Money. On 26 July, Adams scored his first professional goal against Los Angeles FC, scoring the first in a 4–3 defeat.

Inter Miami
On 17 December 2021, it was announced that Adams would sign with Inter Miami ahead of their 2022 season. On 10 June 2022, he agreed to mutually terminate his contract.

On 10 June 2022, Adams joined Saudi Professional League side Al Shabab on a four-year deal.

Personal life
Born in England, Adams is of Eritrean descent.

Career statistics

Club

References

External links
 

1996 births
Living people
English footballers
Association football midfielders
Syracuse Orange men's soccer players
USL League Two players
Boston United F.C. players
Reading United A.C. players
Chicago Fire FC players
FC Tulsa players
Memphis 901 FC players
Atlanta United FC players
Atlanta United 2 players
Inter Miami CF players
Footballers from Nottingham
Chicago Fire FC draft picks
English people of Eritrean descent
Major League Soccer players
USL Championship players
English expatriate sportspeople in the United States
Expatriate soccer players in the United States
English expatriate footballers
Al-Shabab FC (Riyadh) players
Expatriate footballers in Saudi Arabia
English expatriate sportspeople in Saudi Arabia
National League (English football) players